2020 Marib attack may refer to:

January 2020 Marib attack
August 2020 Marib attack